Winter in Venice is a studio album by Swedish jazz band Esbjörn Svensson Trio (E.S.T.), released in 1997. It was awarded the Swedish Grammy in 1998 for Best Jazz Album.  It was released by the record label ACT Music.

Track listing
"Calling Home"
"Winter In Venice"
"At Saturday"
"Semblance Suite In Three Or Four Movements I"
"Semblance Suite In Three Or Four Movements II"
"Semblance Suite In Three Or Four Movements III"
"Semblance Suite In Three Or Four Movements IV"
"Don't Cuddle That Crazy Cat"
"Damned Back Blues"
"In The Fall Of Things"
"As The Crow Flies"
"Second Page"
"Herkules Jonssons Låt"

Personnel
 Esbjörn Svensson – piano
 Dan Berglund – bass
 Magnus Öström – drums

 Johan Ekelund – producer

External links
  E.S.T. Article on Jazz Police 22 June 2006
  E.S.T. Article/interview on All About Jazz 29 November 2004: What Jazz Is, Not Was

References

1997 albums
Esbjörn Svensson Trio albums
ACT Music albums